Požgaj is a Serbo-Croatian surname. It is derived from the town of Požega, Croatia. In 1556, a Jovan Požgaj was mentioned along with 7 other Komárom vajda (vojvoda). For a longer time it is found in the Zagreb County and Međimurje County, and includes Hungarian linguistical elements, as does other surnames found in Međimurje. In Hungarian, the name is spelled Poszgai or Poszgay. It may refer to:

Zvonimir Požgaj, Croatian architect
Aleksandar Požgaj, Serbian politician and businessman

See also
Požgajić

References

Croatian surnames
Serbian surnames
Toponymic surnames